.post is a sponsored top-level domain (STLD) available exclusively for the postal sector. It is the first STLD to be 100% secured by DNSSEC. .post aims to integrate the physical, financial and electronic dimensions of postal services to enable and facilitate e-post, e-finance, e-commerce and e-government services. The domain was approved by ICANN on April 8, 2005 as a sponsored TLD in the second group of new TLD applications evaluated in 2004.

Having delegated authority for .post, the Universal Postal Union (UPU) develops, implements and monitors government rules for it. It is also responsible for attributing domain names for postal-sector stake holders who meet the eligibility criteria.

The UPU, which is based in Bern, became the first United Nations Organization (UNO) to be granted the right to operate an STLD by ICANN in 2004, in the first group of new TLD applications evaluated in 2004. The UPU was the only UNO organization to pass all criteria by ICANN as a truly representative organization to sponsor a top-level domain.

In 2009, ICANN and the UPU signed an historic agreement giving the UPU managing authority over .post as a top-level domain. The agreement came about after  negotiations and public review through ICANN's public comment process, reviews within the UPU governing councils and consideration by ICANN's Board of Directors.

The STLD was added to the IANA TLD registry on August 8, 2012.

Purpose 
.post was designed to serve the needs of the global postal community in cyberspace. The idea behind .post was to identify legitimate postal services and avoid confusion for individuals, business and stakeholders. As of October 2014, out of 192 UPU member countries, 38 are full members of the Dot Post Group (DPG), which is appointed to oversee the development of this platform. A few of those already launched their .post web site.  Most of them offer a web interface to traditional post office services, such as printed letters and parcels delivery.  One of them also features Postal Registered electronic Mail (PReM) among its services.

Authentication 
To register a .post domain, the UPU asks entities to submit a Community ID request  Registrants must be approved as being members of the .post Sponsored Community before registering domains.

Prior to registering a .post domain, the UPU verifies the registrant's eligibility to register a domain name and issues a .post Community ID.

Each applicant is required to provide legal proof of ownership of the string, as well as falling into 1 of 11 Registrant Groups set out in paragraph 3.3 of the .post Domain Management Policy.

References

External links

Postal services
Universal Postal Union
Sponsored top-level domains
Top-level domains
Internet properties established in 2009
Computer-related introductions in 2009

de:Top-Level-Domain#Gesponserte Domains (sTLD)
sv:Toppdomän#Generiska toppdomäner